Epiphany Azinge, SAN, (born 13 November 1957) is a Nigerian lawyer and academic. He was the 5th Director-General of the Nigerian Institute of Advanced Legal Studies from 2009 and 2014. He is a Judge at the Commonwealth Arbitral Tribunal sitting in London, where he represents Nigeria and Africa. He is the founder and senior partner at Azinge & Azinge, a law firm in Abuja where his wife Valerie Azinge (also a SAN) is also a partner.

Education
Epiphany had his secondary education at Sanit Patrick's College, Asaba from 1970 to 1975. He studied law at the University of Lagos in 1976 and graduated with a Bachelor of Laws. He was called to the Nigerian Bar in 1980. He proceeded to the University of London for his Master’s degree in comparative constitutional law and shipping law in 1983. He proceeded to the London School of Economics for his Ph.D. His thesis was on Electoral Laws in Nigeria.
In June 2015, he was appointed a member of the Commonwealth Secretariat Arbitral Tribunal (CSAT) for a period of four years. He was re-appointed for another term of four years in 2019.

Career
He started his career as a lecturer at the University of Benin, and then at the University of Abuja, where he introduced the information technology law in Nigeria in 1996. He also lectured at the Nasarawa State University. He was appointed Special Assistant to the Honourable Attorney General of the Federation and Minister of Justice, Michael Ashikodi Agbamuche where he served from 1991 to 1997. He was promoted to the status of a Senior Advocate of Nigeria in 2006.
He was the Director-General of the Nigerian Institute of Advanced legas Studies from 2009 to 2014.

Recognitions
Azinge was awarded honorary LLD in 2013 by the Commonwealth University, Belize. In 2014 he was decorated with the national honour of Officer of the Order of the Niger (OON) by President Goodluck Jonathan. He is a fellow of the Nigerian Institute of Advanced Legal Studies.

Personal life
Azinge is an indigene of Asaba, Nigeria. He is married to Dr. Valerie Azinge, SAN and they have four children together.

References

Living people
1957 births
Senior Advocates of Nigeria
University of Lagos alumni
Alumni of the University of London
Alumni of the London School of Economics
20th-century Nigerian lawyers
People from Delta State
Academic staff of the University of Benin (Nigeria)
Academic staff of the University of Abuja
21st-century Nigerian judges